Sir Patrick Houstoun of that Ilk, 1st Baronet (or Houston; died 1696) was a Scottish politician who served as a member of the Parliament of Scotland for Renfrewshire in 1661 and Dunbartonshire in 1681–1682 and of the Convention of the Estates of Scotland for Dunbartonshire in 1678. He was knighted and then created a Baronet of Nova Scotia on 29 February 1668.

Early life
Houstoun was the elder son of Sir Ludovick (or Louis) Houstoun of that Ilk (d. 1662) by his spouse, Margaret, daughter of Patrick Maxwell of Newark.

Personal life
Sir Patrick Houston married Anne, daughter of John, 1st Lord Bargany, and had issue, five sons and four daughters. Of the latter, three made very notable Scottish marriages:

 Margaret, married Sir Humphery Colquhoun of Luss, Bt.
 Anne, married three times: (1) Sir John Inglis, 2nd Baronet of Cramond, (2) Sir William Hamilton of Whitelaw, (3) Adam Cockburn of Ormiston, Lord Justice Clerk. She is a great-great-grandmother of Sir James Clerk Maxwell.
 Jean, married three times: (1) Walter Dundas of that Ilk, (2) Richard Lockhart of Lee, (3) Ludovick Grant of that Ilk.

Sir Patrick was succeeded by his eldest son and heir, Sir John Houstoun, 2nd Baronet of that Ilk.

References 

Attribution

Year of birth unknown
1696 deaths
Members of the Parliament of Scotland 1661–1663
Members of the Convention of the Estates of Scotland 1678
Members of the Parliament of Scotland 1681–1682
Baronets in the Baronetage of Nova Scotia
Shire Commissioners to the Parliament of Scotland
Politics of Perth and Kinross
Scottish knights
Knights Bachelor